Granville Hayward Crabtree, Jr. (born November 29, 1929) is an American attorney and former Florida state legislator.

Crabtree was born in Chattanooga, Tennessee in 1929. He enlisted in the United States Army and, at the rank of captain, served in Europe and Korea from 1948 to 1953. He moved to Florida in 1956. He attended the University of California, Berkeley, University of Missouri, and George Washington University to receive his B.S. and LL.B degrees. He is a member of the Lambda Chi Alpha fraternity. He was a student traffic court judge while in university.

From 1961 to 1962, he served as an attorney on the Sarasota County Planning Commission, Sarasota County Tax Assessor and for the city of North Port Charlotte. He was elected to the Florida House of Representatives as a Republican for Sarasota County in 1966 and served until 1976.

He is married to Paulette Vitrier of Sarasota and has two children, Michelle and John. He is a member of the American Bar Association.

References

Living people
1929 births
Politicians from Chattanooga, Tennessee
Republican Party members of the Florida House of Representatives
University of California, Berkeley alumni
University of Missouri alumni
George Washington University Law School alumni